Out Newton is a hamlet in the East Riding of Yorkshire, England, in an area known as Holderness.

The hamlet was mentioned in the Domesday Book as having six ploughlands,  of meadowland and four villagers. The name is believed to stem from Outer Newton, with Newton itself meaning new homestead or village. It forms part of the civil parish of Easington, and was formerly in the wapentake of Holderness.

A seven turbine wind farm, capable of generating 9 MW of electricity and operated by RWE, is situated on the coast near to the settlement.

References

External links

Villages in the East Riding of Yorkshire
Holderness
Wind farms in England